Kunal Kohli is an Indian film director, producer, actor and writer in Bollywood. He is best known as the director of Hum Tum (2004) and Fanaa (2006). He also owns the production house Kunal Kohli Productions, whose first was his Thoda Pyaar Thoda Magic (2008).

Career
Kohli started out as a film critic in the late 1990s and hosted the show Chalo Cinema on Zee TV. He also directed some music videos: Bally Sagoo's "Mera Laung Gawacha", Kamaal Khan's "Jaana", Bali Brahmbhatt's "Tere Bin Jeena Nahin", Shiamak Davar's "Jaane Kisne", Hema Sardesai's "Bole Humse Kuch Na Gori" and Rajshri Music's "Yeh Hai Prem", a song for Alisha Chinoy with Milind Soman. He directed about 24 music videos before moving to TV and films. He made his directorial debut with the television series Trikon. 

He has made 4 movies for Yash Raj Films, owned by the late Yash Chopra. His first film under their banner was the romantic comedy Mujhse Dosti Karoge! (2002) which did not fare well at the box office despite much hype. It starred Rani Mukherji, Hrithik Roshan and Kareena Kapoor.

His second venture the romantic comedy-drama Hum Tum, starring Saif Ali Khan and Rani Mukherji, as one of the biggest hits of 2004 and established him as a director. Hum Tum won 5 Filmfare awards, including Best Director for Kohli. He won against his mentor Yash Chopra who was nominated for Veer-Zaara.
 
He then directed the romantic thriller Fanaa, starring Aamir Khan and Kajol, who made her comeback after a 5-year break from the industry and earned herself a Filmfare Award for Best Actress for her performance in the film. The film was released on 26 May 2006 and emerged as one of the biggest hits of the year. It also proved to be controversial and was banned in the state of Gujarat due to protests against the lead actor Khan.

Kohli wrote, directed and co-produced the Yash Raj film Thoda Pyaar Thoda Magic (2008), starring Saif Ali Khan, Rani Mukherji, Rishi Kapoor and Amisha Patel. He then produced the romantic comedy-drama Break Ke Baad (2010), which was directed by Danish Aslam and starred Deepika Padukone and Imran Khan in lead roles. 

One of his projects Phir Se... was stuck in controversies involving allegations of plagiarism, however, the Supreme court later on allowed the release of the film upon settlement between the parties, while making him pay Rs. 25 lakhs to Jyoti Kapoor, the plaintiff. It was released on Netflix on 15 January 2018. Kohli has a three film contract with Reliance Big Pictures involving financing, distribution and marketing. This contract is estimated to be worth Rs 1.50 billion.

Television
Kohli judged the popular reality dance TV show Nach Baliyes second season for Star Plus in 2005. He also judged the children's reality show on Sony TV, Chota Packet Bada Dhamaka in 2005. In April 2014, it was reported that he would be the judge on NDTV's talent hunt show Ticket to Bollywood.

Personal life
Kohli is married to Ravina Kohli, who was the director of Koffee with Karan, and headed Yash Raj TV. They have a daughter, Radha who they adopted. His maternal aunt died of the COVID-19 in May 2020.

Music videos

Filmography

TV shows
Nach Baliye 2 (judge) 
Chota Packet Bada Dhamaka (judge) 
Stardust Awards (host)
Chalo Cinema (host)
Ticket to Bollywood (judge)

References

External links

 

21st-century Indian film directors
Hindi-language film directors
Filmfare Awards winners
Screen Awards winners
Living people
1970 births